The Great Daylight Fireball (also known as the Grand Teton Meteor ) was an Earth-grazing fireball that passed within  of Earth's surface at 20:29 UTC on August 10, 1972. It was seen by many people and recorded on film and by space-borne sensors. An eyewitness to the event, located in Missoula, Montana, saw the object pass directly overhead and heard a double sonic boom. The smoke trail lingered in the atmosphere for several minutes.

The atmospheric pass modified the object's mass and orbit around the Sun. A 1994 study found that it is probably still in an Earth-crossing orbit and predicted that it would pass close to Earth again in August 1997. However, the object has not been observed again and so its post-encounter orbit remains unknown.

Description
Analysis of its appearance and trajectory showed the object was about 3–14 m (10–45 ft) in diameter, depending on whether it was a comet made of ice or a stony and therefore denser asteroid. Other sources identified it as an Apollo asteroid in an Earth-crossing orbit that would make a subsequent close approach to Earth in August 1997. In 1994, Czech astronomer Zdeněk Ceplecha reanalysed the data and suggested the passage would have reduced the asteroid's mass to about a third or half of its original mass (reducing its diameter to ).

The object was tracked by military surveillance systems and sufficient data obtained to determine its orbit both before and after its 100-second passage through Earth's atmosphere. If it had not entered at such a grazing angle, this meteoroid would have lost all its velocity in the upper atmosphere, possibly ending in an airburst, and any remnant would have fallen at terminal velocity.

See also
 List of asteroid close approaches to Earth

References

Further reading

External links
 US19720810 (Daylight Earth grazer) orbital characteristics from Global Superbolide Network Archive, 2000
 Fireball, meteorite, bolide, meteor, video and photo link to photos and cine film by Linda Baker
 Earthgrazer: The Great Daylight Fireball of 1972 overview of the event including photo by NASA's Astronomy Picture of the Day
 Astronomical Society of the Pacific: Observation of Meteoroid Impacts by Space-Based Sensors – one of several similar events; includes ground track
 Earth Impact Calculator

Meteoroids
19720810
19720810
Modern Earth impact events
Earth-grazing fireballs
August 1972 events in North America
August 1972 events in the United States